Kyle Vernie Peter Greaux (born 26 April 1988) is a Trinidad and Tobago sprinter competing primarily in the 200 metres. He competed at the 2013 and 2015 World Championships without advancing from the first round. He also competed at the Track and Field Racers Series 5 at the Hasely Crawford Stadium in Port-of-Spain on 20 January 2018 where he ran the fastest 100m heat of 10.41 seconds with wind being 2.1 m/s. On 17 February 2018, the month after, he competed in the NAAA Pre-Commonwealth Meet at the same venue in the 200 metres where he ran the fastest 200 metres with a time of 20.40 seconds with wind being 3.9 m/s. He was the only one in the Men's 200 metres to qualify for the Commonwealth Games which was held at the Gold Coast in Australia by surpassing the world standard of 20.50 seconds.

Competition record

1Did not finish in the final

Personal bests
Outdoor
100 metres – 10.16 (+1.8 m/s, Port-of-Spain 2017)
200 metres – 19.97 (CAC Games, Colombia 2018)
400 metres – 47.14 (Port-of-Spain 2013)
Indoor
60 metres – 6.87 (New York 2015)
200 metres – 21.25 (New York 2015)

References

External links
 

1988 births
Living people
Trinidad and Tobago male sprinters
World Athletics Championships athletes for Trinidad and Tobago
Athletes (track and field) at the 2014 Commonwealth Games
Athletes (track and field) at the 2018 Commonwealth Games
Athletes (track and field) at the 2015 Pan American Games
People from Sangre Grande region
Athletes (track and field) at the 2016 Summer Olympics
Olympic athletes of Trinidad and Tobago
Central American and Caribbean Games bronze medalists for Trinidad and Tobago
Competitors at the 2014 Central American and Caribbean Games
Competitors at the 2018 Central American and Caribbean Games
Athletes (track and field) at the 2019 Pan American Games
Pan American Games silver medalists for Trinidad and Tobago
Pan American Games medalists in athletics (track and field)
Central American and Caribbean Games medalists in athletics
Medalists at the 2019 Pan American Games
Commonwealth Games competitors for Trinidad and Tobago
Athletes (track and field) at the 2020 Summer Olympics
Commonwealth Games silver medallists for Trinidad and Tobago
Commonwealth Games medallists in athletics
Athletes (track and field) at the 2022 Commonwealth Games
Medallists at the 2022 Commonwealth Games